"Kusha Las Payas" is a song performed by the Andalusian-Spanish pop group Las Ketchup. It was released in November 2002 as the second single from their debut studio album, Hijas del Tomate. It is a follow-up to their most successful single, "The Ketchup Song (Aserejé)", although this song was not as successful as "Aserejé".

The song is featured in the video game, SSX, but is region-exclusive to Spain only.

Charts

Year-end charts

References

2003 songs
Las Ketchup songs
Spanish-language songs